Miguel Ángel Oca Gaia, better known as Miki Oca (born 15 April 1970 in Madrid), is a former Spanish water polo player, who was a member of the national team that won the gold medal at the 1996 Summer Olympics in Atlanta, Georgia. Four years earlier he won the silver medal. He is the current coach of the Spain women's national water polo team. He led the team to win an Olympic silver medal in 2012, becoming one of a few sportspeople who won Olympic medals in water polo as players and head coaches.

See also
 Spain men's Olympic water polo team records and statistics
 Spain women's Olympic water polo team records and statistics
 List of Olympic champions in men's water polo
 List of Olympic medalists in water polo (men)
 List of world champions in women's water polo
 List of World Aquatics Championships medalists in water polo

References

External links
 

1970 births
Living people
Sportspeople from Madrid
Spanish male water polo players
Water polo drivers
Water polo players at the 1992 Summer Olympics
Water polo players at the 1996 Summer Olympics
Olympic gold medalists for Spain in water polo
Olympic silver medalists for Spain in water polo
Medalists at the 1992 Summer Olympics
Medalists at the 1996 Summer Olympics
Spanish water polo coaches
Spain women's national water polo team coaches
Water polo coaches at the 2012 Summer Olympics
Water polo coaches at the 2016 Summer Olympics
Water polo coaches at the 2020 Summer Olympics
Water polo players from the Community of Madrid
20th-century Spanish people